This list tracks and ranks the population of the ten most populous cities and other settlements in the State of Alaska by decade, as reported by each decennial United States Census, starting with the 1880 Census.

The ten largest "places" from 1880 through 1900 are all unincorporated as there were no incorporated places recorded during those censuses. The top 10 places listed areas from 1910 through 2020 are all separate incorporated places.

This list generally refers only to the population of individual places within their defined limits at the time of the indicated census. Some of these places have since been annexed or merged into other cities. Other places may have expanded their borders due to such annexation or consolidation.

Six consolidated city-borough governments exist; Juneau City and Borough, Skagway Municipality, Sitka City and Borough, Yakutat City and Borough, Wrangell City and Borough, as well as the state's most populous city, Anchorage. Though its legal name is the Municipality of Anchorage, it is considered a consolidated city-borough under state law.

1880

There were no incorporated places recorded during the census. The following are ten largest unincorporated villages that were enumerated separately. The territory was divided into six divisions.

1890 

There were no incorporated places recorded during the census. The following are ten largest unincorporated settlements that were enumerated separately. The territory was divided into seven districts.

1900 

There were no incorporated places recorded during the census. The following are ten largest unincorporated settlements that were enumerated separately. Only two "districts" existed as the subdivisions couldn't be further ascertained.

1910 

In 1910 census, all incorporated places in the dataset were referred to as "towns". "Villages" and other areas were unincorporated. The territory was also divided into four judicial divisions.

1920

1930 

The 1930 census for Alaska was conducted October 1, 1929.

1940 

The 1940 census for Alaska was conducted October 1, 1939.

1950 

For the first time since the first census in 1880, all ten incorporated places surpassed 1,000 residents.

1960 

The 1960 Census was the first census taken since statehood in 1959. Method of divisions changed from four judicial divisions to twenty-four election districts.

1970 

The 1970 Census saw the method of divisions changed once again from Election Districts to Boroughs and Census Areas.

1980

1990

2000

2010

2020

See also
Alaska
Demographics of Alaska
List of cities in Alaska
List of census-designated places in Alaska
Alaska statistical areas
List of Alaska placenames of Native American origin

List of most populous cities in the United States by decade

References

Notes

Sources

External links 

Alaska
Alaska geography-related lists